Eublemma colla is a species of moth of the family Erebidae described by William Schaus and W. G. Clements in 1893. It is found in Sierra Leone.

See also
List of moths of Sierra Leone

References

Boletobiinae
Moths of Africa
Moths described in 1893